Living dinosaur may refer to:
Birds, the only known living dinosaurs
Living fossils, extant taxa that closely resemble organisms otherwise known only from the fossil record
Paleocene dinosaurs, non-avian dinosaurs alleged to have survived into the beginning of the Paleocene epoch
Living dinosaurs, a belief of adherents to the pseudosciences of cryptozoology and young Earth creationism
Mokele-mbembe, a legendary creature claimed by adherents of the pseudosciences of young Earth creationism and cryptozoology to be a "living dinosaur"
Partridge Creek monster, the subject of a story by French writer Georges Dupuy

See also 
Lazarus taxon, a taxon that disappears from the fossil record only to appear again later